Samia Rhaiem is a Tunisian actress.

Filmography

Cinema

Feature films 
 1995 : La Danse du feu by Selma Baccar
 1998 : Ghodoua Nahrek by Mohamed Ben Smaïl
 2002 : La Boîte magique by Ridha Behi
 2004 : La Villa by Mohamed Damak
 2005 : Khochkhach by Selma Baccar
 2010 : The String by Mehdi Ben Attia : Raja
 2015 : Horra by Moez Kamoun
 2017 : Of Skin and Men by Mehdi Ben Attia
 2017 : El Jaida by Selma Baccar

Short films 
 1998 : Le Festin by Mohamed Damak
 1999 : April by Raja Amari
 2012 : Case départ by Karim Belhadj
 2012 : Bousculade du 9 avril 1938 by Tarak Khalladi and Sawssen Saya

Television 
 1996 - 1997 : El Khottab Al Bab by Slaheddine Essid : Safiya Tehifa
 2001 : Dhafayer by Habib Mselmani
 2002 : Gamret Sidi Mahrous by Slaheddine Essid : Marcelle Pascalini-Souilah
 2005 : Chaâbane fi Ramadhane by Selma Baccar
 2007 : Kamanjet Sallema by Hamadi Arafa : Akila Abdelmaksoud
 2008 - 2009 : Maktoub (saisons 1-2) by Sami Fehri : Camilia Abd El Hak
 2009 - 2010 : Njoum Ellil (seasons 1-2) by Madih Belaïd
 2013 : Layem by Khaled Barsaoui
 2014 : Talaa Wala Habet by Majdi Smiri : Lilia
 2015 : Naouret El Hawa (saison 2) by Madih Belaïd : Beya Ben Abdallah
 2017 - 2018 : Jnoun El Qayla by Amine Chiboub : Fatma
 2018 : Tej El Hadhra by Sami Fehri : Lella Aicha
 2019 - 2021 : Machair by Muhammet Gök : Mère and Taher Yahia
 2020 : Ken Ya Makenech (saison 1) by Abdelhamid Bouchnak : Cendrillon 
 2021 : El Foundou by Saoussen Jemni : Lella Jnaina

References

External links

Tunisian film actresses
People from Tunis
Living people
20th-century Tunisian actresses
1955 births